Vũ Bích Hường (born 30 November 1969) is a retired Vietnamese athlete specialising in the 100 metres hurdles. She represented her country at two Summer Olympics, in 1996 and 2000, failing to qualify for the second round at both occasions.

Her personal best in the event is 13.36 seconds achieved twice in 1999. This is the current national record.

Competition record

References

External links
 

1969 births
Living people
Vietnamese female hurdlers
Olympic athletes of Vietnam
Athletes (track and field) at the 1996 Summer Olympics
Athletes (track and field) at the 2000 Summer Olympics
Athletes (track and field) at the 1998 Asian Games
Southeast Asian Games medalists in athletics
Southeast Asian Games silver medalists for Vietnam
Vu Bich Huong
Competitors at the 2001 Southeast Asian Games
Competitors at the 2003 Southeast Asian Games
Asian Games competitors for Vietnam
21st-century Vietnamese women